Oroperipatus bimbergi is a species of velvet worm in the Peripatidae family. The female of this species has 27 or 28 pairs of legs, usually 27; the male has 24 or 25 usually, rarely 26. The type locality is in Colombia.

References

Onychophorans of tropical America
Onychophoran species
Animals described in 1913